HNLMS Tromp, was an  unprotected cruiser built in Amsterdam for the Royal Netherlands Navy.

Service history
Tromp was built at the Rijkswerf Amsterdam and commissioned on 30 May 1879. The ship left for the Dutch East Indies in October 1882 and returned a year later. On the journey home she was sent to check on Maculla on the Congo river where locals had attacked a Dutch factory. In 1885 she left again for the Dutch East Indies staying there for two years. Between 1888 and 1890 she made several voyages to  Norway, South America and the West Indies. In 1893 tromp was again send to the Dutch East Indies where she oversaw pearl diving activities in the Easter parts of the Dutch East Indies. In July 1894 she participated in a military expedition against Lombok. She served as station ship at  Olehleh Aceh. April till June 1896 she participated in the shelling of Kampongs in that region. 1987 she returned to Europe and from 18 March till 15 May she was present at Smyrna, Asia Minor to protect Dutch interest in the region. In 1899 she again left for the  Dutch East Indies where she served as flagship for the Aceh division. In 1902 she returned to the Netherlands and was sold for scrap in 1904.

External links
 Tomp at onzemarinevloot

Cruisers of the Royal Netherlands Navy
Ships built in Amsterdam
1877 ships